Hope and Glory is a BBC television drama about a comprehensive school struggling with financial, staffing and disciplinary problems, and faced with closure. It starred Lenny Henry as maverick "Superhead" Ian George, enlisted to turn around the school's fortunes.

It was created by Lucy Gannon, who had previously created Soldier Soldier, and was inspired by a real head teacher named William Atkinson, who had turned around a secondary school in London which had been placed into special measures.

Plot

Ian George, the head of an exclusive school, is asked to take a look at Hope Park Comprehensive School, which is in special measures, and asked to confirm its closure.  When he visits the school, he's greeted by disaffected students and teachers alike.  The sixth form centre lies derelict after being torched a few years previously, while the music room is full of untouched expensive equipment, because the school could not attract a music teacher.  The outgoing head (Peter Davison) breaks down during his farewell speech and delivers an emotional rant against the students, telling them how worthless they are.

After meeting staff and pupils, in particular pupil Keeley Porter and Deputy Head Debbie "Debs" Bryan (Redman), George believes there is some hope for the school.  He is offered help by the chair of governors, Derek, whose son died young and would have been at the school.  Ian turns down a government job to take over as the new Head.

With the help of "Debs", George is able to fix the school's issues. He identifies the talents of rebellious students, and the music equipment is finally used.

Romances developed between Ian and Debs, and Tony (Lee Warburton) and Sally (Sara Stephens).

Philip Whitchurch played the chair of governors, who was desperate to save the school. The refurbished and replenished library was subsequently dedicated to his deceased son. The Chief Education Officer was played by Richard Griffiths.

Production
Bushey Hall School in Watford, Francis Coombe School in Watford and Langleybury School in Three Rivers, Hertfordshire, were used as locations for the school.

Classical music featured throughout the first series, and a compilation CD was released. An animated title sequence was introduced in series 2, with theme music composed by Nick Bicât and performed by the London Chamber Orchestra.

Gannon wrote the series with the intention that it would be transmitted at 8.00pm, before the watershed; however, the BBC instead scheduled it at 9.30pm.

Episode guide

Series 1

Series 2

The four episodes of the second season were transmitted before the summer holidays (27 June – 18 July 2000), with the third series and final six episodes transmitted in the autumn of the same year (4 October – 5 November).

Series 3

Reception

The series attracted mixed reviews. Writing in  New Statesman David Jays says that Lucy Gannon's characters are sharpened by indignation, and "sorrow rounds them in the Dickensian manner". He also praises the show's use of classical music, rather than "second guessing youthful tunes and  getting it cringingly wrong".  The Observers Caroline Boucher praised Gannon's "speedy character establishment" and Henry's "convincing" portrayal. Adam Sweeting in The Guardian was more critical, suggesting it is "old-fashioned melodrama", unfavorably contrasting Gannon with celebrated writers such as Jimmy McGovern and Alan Bleasdale. The use of classical music was "disorienting", and Sweeting suggests that "maybe education is too pressing and prickly an issue to be liquidised into soap opera, with its inevitable clichés and illogicalities." Writing in the Financial Times, Christopher Dunkley says the drama has "moments of interest", although Joe Joseph in The Times was very critical of the first series.

Home media
All three series were released on DVD (Region 2 and 4) on 15 May 2006. A compilation audio CD featuring some of the classical music used in the first series was released on 1 October 1999.

References

External links

British Film Institute Screen Online
BBCi minisite with cast interviews, character profiles and season three episode guide.

BBC television dramas
1990s British drama television series
2000s British drama television series
1999 British television series debuts
2000 British television series endings
English-language television shows